Hasan Mahmud (born 12 October 1999) is a Bangladeshi cricketer. He made his international debut for the Bangladesh cricket team in March 2020. He is one of the impressive fast bowlers Bangladesh have ever produced. With great swing, ability to bowl yorkers,good line and length and excellent economy.Impressive performances in Bangladesh Premier League 2019-2020 paved the way for him into Bangladesh National team.He played in ICC U-19 World Cup 2016

Domestic career
He made his first-class debut for Chittagong Division in the 2017–18 National Cricket League on 13 October 2017. He made his List A debut for Khelaghar Samaj Kallyan Samity in the 2017–18 Dhaka Premier Division Cricket League on 5 February 2018.

In November 2019, he was selected to play for the Dhaka Platoon in the 2019–20 Bangladesh Premier League. He made his Twenty20 debut for Dhaka Platoon in the 2019–20 Bangladesh Premier League on 12 December 2019.

International career
In December 2017, he was named in Bangladesh's squad for the 2018 Under-19 Cricket World Cup.

In November 2019, he was named in Bangladesh's squad for the 2019 ACC Emerging Teams Asia Cup in Bangladesh. Later the same month he was named in Bangladesh's squad for the men's cricket tournament at the 2019 South Asian Games. The Bangladesh team won the gold medal, after they beat Sri Lanka by seven wickets in the final.

In January 2020, he was named in Bangladesh's Twenty20 International (T20I) squad for their series against Pakistan. The following month, he was named in Bangladesh's Test squad for their one-off match against Zimbabwe. In March 2020, he was named in Bangladesh's T20I squad for their series against Zimbabwe. He made his T20I debut for Bangladesh, against Zimbabwe, on 11 March 2020.

In January 2021, he was named in Bangladesh's One Day International (ODI) squad for their series against the West Indies. He made his ODI debut for Bangladesh, against the West Indies, on 20 January 2021. Later the same month, he was named in Bangladesh's Test squad, also for their series against the West Indies.

References

External links
 

1999 births
Living people
Bangladeshi cricketers
Bangladesh One Day International cricketers
Bangladesh Twenty20 International cricketers
People from Lakshmipur District
Chittagong Division cricketers
Dhaka Dominators cricketers
Khelaghar Samaj Kallyan Samity cricketers
South Asian Games gold medalists for Bangladesh
South Asian Games medalists in cricket